The Løkken Mine is an underground pyrite mine located in the municipality of Orkland in Trøndelag, Norway. The mine was operative from 1654 to 1987, from the mining community Løkken Verk. It contained the largest deposits of its kind in Norway. Between 1654 and 1845, a total of 11,300 tons of copper was produced from the mine. From 1904 the mine was run by the company Orkla Grube-Aktiebolag, and until 1987 a total of 24 million tons of pyrite was produced from the mine. In addition to sulphur, the pyrite contained about 2% copper, in addition to zinc and traces of silver and gold. The products were originally transported to the sea by horse and sledge during winter time. From 1908 the ore was transported by the Thamshavn Line, which was the first electrical railway line in Norway. The annual production was about 350,000 tons of ore during its final years.

1654 – 1904

Traditional mining methods, only the copper exploited.

1904 – 1987

Large-scale production. Modern methods. Electricity. Transport of ore by railway (Thamshavn Line). Melting plant at Thamshavn.

Aftermath

Museums. Orkla Group.

References

Underground mines in Norway
1654 establishments in Norway
1987 disestablishments in Norway
Buildings and structures in Trøndelag
Meldal